Svetoslav Valeriev (born 3 March 1988) is a Bulgarian football midfielder who plays for Lokomotiv Mezdra.

References

1988 births
Living people
Bulgarian footballers
PFC Lokomotiv Mezdra players
FC Botev Vratsa players
First Professional Football League (Bulgaria) players

Association football midfielders